Ludovic is an opéra comique in two acts to a French-language libretto by Jules-Henri Vernoy de Saint-Georges. The music, by Ferdinand Hérold, was left unfinished at his death, and the work was completed by his deputy at the Opéra-Comique, Fromental Halévy. Hérold had only written the overture, four numbers and the beginning of the act 1 finale.

The plot, elements of which were later reworked by Halévy and Saint-Georges in the opera Le val d'Andorre (1847), centres on misplaced alliance, love, forced conscription, flight, pardon, and marriage.

Chopin wrote a set of variations in B-flat major, Variations brillantes, Op. 12 (1833), on the act 1 aria "Je vends des scapulaires" (I sell scapulars).

Performance history
The opera was premiered by the Paris Opéra-Comique at the Salle de la Bourse on 16 May 1833, five months after Hérold's death. It achieved 70 performances by the end of 1834, making it a modest success, which set the foundation for Halévy's career.

Roles

Synopsis
Place: Francesca's farm, the village of Albano, near Rome

The main characters are Ludovic, a farmer from Corsica; Francesca, who owns the farm he manages; and her cousin Gregorio. When Francesca is about to marry Gregorio, Ludovic shoots her and is sentenced to death. Francesca recovers and realizes she loves Ludovic.

References

Further reading
Jordan, Ruth, Fromental Halévy. London, 1994.

External links
; 

1833 operas
French-language operas
Opera world premieres at the Opéra-Comique
Operas by Ferdinand Hérold
Operas by Fromental Halévy
Opéras comiques
Operas completed by others
Operas set in Italy
Operas
Unfinished operas